Trevor Victor Norman Fortescue, CBE (28 August 1916 – 29 September 2008), known as Tim Fortescue, was a British politician. He was the Conservative Member of Parliament (MP) for Liverpool Garston from 1966 to 1974.

Early life
Fortescue was born on 28 August 1916 in Chingford, Essex, England. He was educated at Uppingham School, a private school in Uppingham, Rutland. He then went to King's College, Cambridge to study modern languages.

In 1938 he graduated and joined the Colonial Service. He was posted to Hong Kong and was there when it was captured by the Japanese during the Battle of Hong Kong in December 1941. He remained in Japanese captivity until the surrender of Japan in 1945.

After World War 2, he worked for the Colonial Service, the United Nations Food and Agriculture Organization, the Milk Marketing Board and Nestlé before embarking on a career in politics.

Political career
Fortescue was first elected to Parliament in the 1966 general election. He was re-elected to the 1970 general election and, having been appointed by Edward Heath as an assistant whip under Francis Pym, served as a senior whip, Lord Commissioner of the Treasury from 1971 until he resigned in September 1973. He retired from the Commons at the February 1974 general election at which the Labour candidate was elected.

After leaving politics, he became general secretary of the Food and Drink Industries Council, now called the Food and Drink Federation.

Revelations about paedophilia in the House of Commons 
Fortescue worked as a whip in Edward Heath's government between 1970 and 1973.  In a 1995 BBC documentary, Westminster's Secret Service, he said the following about what the Whips would do for MPs who were in danger of being mired in scandal:

Death 
Fortescue died in 2008 aged 92.

References

External links 
 

1916 births
2008 deaths
Commanders of the Order of the British Empire
Conservative Party (UK) MPs for English constituencies
UK MPs 1966–1970
UK MPs 1970–1974
Members of the Parliament of the United Kingdom for Liverpool constituencies
People from Chingford
People educated at Uppingham School
Alumni of King's College, Cambridge
Tim
World War II civilian prisoners held by Japan